Diana Latow Blank (born September 13, 1942) is an American philanthropist who founded the Kendeda Fund and the former wife of The Home Depot co-founder, Arthur Blank.

Biography
Blank was raised in a middle class, Catholic family. Through her Kendeda Fund, founded in 1993, Blank has historically donated anonymously to various Georgia-based causes including $4 million to the Atlanta Symphony Orchestra in the mid-1990s; and $20 million to Children's Healthcare of Atlanta to enable the purchase of Hughes Spalding Children's Hospital, a historically-black hospital in Atlanta, in 2006. In 2015, she was revealed as the person who provided a $30 million grant to Georgia Tech for their Living Building Challenge 3.0. tasked with building the "most environmentally-sound building ever constructed in the Southeast."

The Kendeda Fund donates between $40 million and $50 million annually and has donated over $500 million through 2017 with the goal of spending all its assets by 2024. The name "Kendeda" comes from the names of Blank's three children, Kenny, Dena, and Danielle. Her daughter Dena Blank Kimball serves as the executive director of the Kendeda Fund.

Personal life
She has three children with Arthur Blank (born 1942): Kenny Blank, Dena Blank Kimball, and Danielle Blank Thomsen; they divorced in 1993. Her son, Kenny Blank and his wife Nancy; and her daughter Dena and her husband Josh Kimball, serve as directors of The Arthur M. Blank Family Foundation.

References

1942 births
Living people
American philanthropists